Sube a mi Motora (commonly referred as Súbete a mi Moto) is song by Menudo from their 1981 album Quiero Ser. It became arguably the album's most popular song, topping the charts in Puerto Rico, Mexico and Venezuela. It is considered by many Menudo fans to have been the group's best song ever and their signature song. Rene Farrait was the lead singer for this song.

Súbete a mi Moto (Get on my motorcycle in English) created some controversy in Puerto Rico, because in Puerto Rico "moto", at the moment the song came out, was the term used for illegal drugs (marihuana cigarette). Because of that, the song's name was different in Mexico than the original name using the term "motora". The Mexican version also became known across Latin America, and was used in Menudo's 1982 movie, Una Aventura Llamada Menudo,  where Farrait's substitute, Charlie Masso, sang it. Later, Roy Rossello also sang the theme as lead singer.

Sube a mi Motora (Súbete a mi moto) was usually the last song performed at Menudo concerts during the era that the song was a hit. When six members of Menudo returned to the stage in 1998 during their El Reencuentro comeback tour, Sube a mi Motora was always the last song performed by the former Menudo's and Farrait ended the shows by driving a motorcycle around.

In the mid-80s, the song was released in Brazilian Portuguese (Suba na minha Moto) and it was a big hit in Brazil, but the biggest hit of the group in the country was Não Se Reprima. An English version was released as "Motorcycle Dreamer", with Ricky Melendez or Robby Rosa (after Melendez left the band) as lead singers.

Partial lyrics
¡Súbete a mi moto! ¡Nunca has conocido, un amor tan veloz! ¡Súbete a mi moto! ¡Ella guardará, el secreto de dos, de los dos! (loosely translated to: Get on my motorcycle! You have never known, such a fast romance! Get on my motorcycle! It (the motorcycle) will keep, the secret of two, of you and me!)

See also
A Volar

References

External links

Menudo (band) songs
1981 singles
1981 songs
Puerto Rican songs
Spanish songs